Jaroslav Balík (23 June 1924 – 17 October 1996) was a Czechoslovak film director and screenwriter. He directed 26 films between 1952 and 1987.

Selected filmography
 Lovers in the Year One (1973)
 One Silver Piece (1976)

References

External links

1924 births
1996 deaths
Film directors from Prague
Czechoslovak film directors
Czech screenwriters
Male screenwriters
20th-century screenwriters